Charaxes pseudophaeus, the false dusky charaxes, is a butterfly in the family Nymphalidae. It is found in Mozambique and eastern Zimbabwe. The habitat consists of evergreen forests and the fringes of Brachystegia woodland.

The larvae feed on Brachystegia spiciformis.

Taxonomy
It may be a subspecies of Charaxes chintechi
Charaxes pseudophaeus is a member of the large species group Charaxes etheocles.

References

Butterflies described in 1975
pseudophaeus